Theodore Salisbury Woolsey Jr. (October 2, 1879 – July 10, 1933) was a United States Forest Service employee, forestry researcher, professor at Yale University and author of books and articles related to forestry and forest regulation.

Early life

Woolsey was the son of the legal scholar Theodore Salisbury Woolsey, and grandson of Yale University president Theodore Dwight Woolsey.

World War I

In 1917 Woolsey was offered the position of Major in the U.S. Army on the staff of the 10th Engineers (Forestry), a unit organized to produce timber in France for the American military forces during the First World War.  His duties with the 10th Engineers (later the 20th Engineers) included purchasing standing timber to be manufactured for the use of the American Expeditionary Forces in Europe.

Afterwards

After the war, Woolsey returned to Connecticut and worked as a consulting forester,  a lecturer at Yale's forestry school, as well as with several national forestry organizations and conservation groups.

Family life

Theodore Woolsey Jr. married Ruby Hilsman Pickett of Dawson, Georgia, on March 15, 1908. They had five daughters, two of whom were born outside the United States in Switzerland and France, respectively. In his later years his family resided in New Haven, Connecticut, where he died by a self-inflicted gunshot on July 10, 1933.

References 
 Inventory of the Theodore S. Woolsey, Jr., Auxiliary Photograph Collection, circa 1900s - 1910s in the Forest History Society Library and Archives, Durham, NC

Notes

American foresters
1879 births
1933 deaths
Yale University faculty
Cornell family
Forestry academics
History of forestry in the United States
American conservationists
Forestry researchers
Woolsey family
1933 suicides
Suicides by firearm in Connecticut